The Treaty of Cambrai is also known as the Paz de las Damas or Paix des Dames (Ladies' Peace).  On August 3, 1529, this agreement ended a war between the French king Francis I and the Spanish Habsburg emperor Charles V. The treaty temporarily confirmed Spanish (Habsburg) hegemony in the Duchy of Milan and in Southern Italy.

The peace was negotiated and signed at Cambrai by two ladies: Margaret of Austria for the emperor, and Louise of Savoy for the king.

The treaty renewed the Treaty of Madrid (1526), except that it did not exact the surrender of Burgundy to Charles.

Background 
The Peace of Cambrai ended France's involvement in the War of the League of Cognac, which had lasted since 1526. It was signed in the city of Cambrai, the center of the principality-bishopric in the Netherlands (now the French department Nord).

This treaty is also called "Ladies' Peace", since women played an important role in its preparation: the mother of Francis I Louise of Savoy and the aunt of the emperor Margaret of Austria. They represented both monarchs in negotiations, helping them not to lose face. Marguerite of Navarre was also instrumental in this achievement.

Terms 
Under the terms of the peace signed in Cambrai, Francis renounced his claims to Italian lands, Artois and Flanders, but retained Burgundy, which Charles V had abandoned. The treaty provided for the return of Dauphin François and Prince Henry, the future Henry II, to France in exchange for a ransom of 2 million écu. Francis I confirmed his consent to marry Charles V's sister Eleanor and married her on July 7, 1530.

Effects 
The Treaty of Cambrai together with the Treaty of Barcelona (between the emperor and the Pope), which was concluded in June, meant the disintegration of the Cognac League; only the Florentine Republic continued to fight against Charles V, leading to the siege and surrender of Florence in 1530. Nevertheless, the terms of peace did not satisfy Francis I. In 1536, a new conflict began between France and the Habsburg Empire.

References

Bibliography 
 Arfaioli, Maurizio. The Black Bands of Giovanni: Infantry and Diplomacy During the Italian Wars (1526–1528). Pisa: Pisa University Press, Edizioni Plus, 2005. .
 Baumgartner, Frederic J. Louis XII. New York: St. Martin's Press, 1994. .
 Black, Jeremy. "Dynasty Forged by Fire." MHQ: The Quarterly Journal of Military History 18, no. 3 (Spring 2006): 34–43. .
 Blockmans, Wim. Emperor Charles V, 1500–1558. Translated by Isola van den Hoven-Vardon. New York: Oxford University Press, 2002. .
 Guicciardini, Francesco. The History of Italy. Translated by Sydney Alexander. Princeton: Princeton University Press, 1984. .
 Hackett, Francis. Francis the First. Garden City, New York: Doubleday, Doran & Co., 1937.
 Taylor, Frederick Lewis. The Art of War in Italy, 1494–1529. Westport, Conn.: Greenwood Press, 1973. .

External links 
 Treaty of Cambrai in Britannica

Italian Wars
Peace treaties
1529 treaties